Santa Bárbara Airport is an airport  east of Romeral, a town in the Maule Region of Chile.

See also

Transport in Chile
List of airports in Chile

References

External links
OurAirports - Santa Bárbara
FallingRain - Santa Bárbara Airport

Airports in Chile
Airports in Maule Region